Heiko Kröger (born 27 March 1966) is a German Paralympic sailor who won the gold medal in the 2.4 Metre class in the 2000 Paralympics and a silver medal in the 2012 edition. Kröger also has 8 World championships titles.

References

External links
 
 
 

1966 births
Living people
German male sailors (sport)
Sailors at the 2000 Summer Paralympics
Sailors at the 2004 Summer Paralympics
Sailors at the 2008 Summer Paralympics
Sailors at the 2012 Summer Paralympics
Sailors at the 2016 Summer Paralympics
Paralympic medalists in sailing
Medalists at the 2000 Summer Paralympics
Medalists at the 2012 Summer Paralympics
Paralympic gold medalists for Germany
Paralympic silver medalists for Germany
2.4 Metre class sailors
2.4 Metre class world champions
World champions in sailing for Germany